It's Like, You Know... is an American sitcom television series broadcast by ABC. It starred Steven Eckholdt, Chris Eigeman, Evan Handler, A. J. Langer, and Jennifer Grey, and depicted life in Los Angeles as viewed through the eyes of Eigeman's character, a diehard New Yorker named Arthur Garment. The series aired for two seasons, from March 24, 1999, until January 5, 2000.

Synopsis
The show sought to lampoon an upper class Los Angeles lifestyle, in part by presenting the Manhattan writer, Garment, as a fish out of water among Hollywood notables and the idle rich.  In the pilot his character arrives with unconcealed hostility, intent on treating his readers to a bitter satire on the absurdities and excesses of LA culture.  While staying with an old friend from college, Garment finds himself increasingly torn between button-down stern contempt for West Coast attitudes and a growing enchantment with the relaxed whimsy constantly swirling around him.

The show was also notable for featuring the actress Jennifer Grey playing herself, the source of a running joke related to her real-life rhinoplasty.

Cast

Steven Eckholdt as Robbie Graham
Chris Eigeman as Arthur Garment
Evan Handler as Shrug
A. J. Langer as Lauren Woods
Jennifer Grey as Herself

Episodes

Season 1 (1999)

Season 2 (1999–2000)

Broadcast
When ABC canceled the series, seven episodes remained unaired (six episodes from the planned second season, in addition to the original unaired pilot). These episodes have since aired abroad, including in Argentina on Fox Latin America and in Australia on The Comedy Channel.

Reception
Ratings for the series were low, due in part to the sudden explosion of reality programming and ABC's decision to dedicate much of its primetime schedule to the then-popular Who Wants to Be a Millionaire.

References

External links 
 
 

1999 American television series debuts
2000 American television series endings
1990s American sitcoms
2000s American sitcoms
American Broadcasting Company original programming
English-language television shows
Television series about Jews and Judaism
Television series by DreamWorks Television
Television shows set in Los Angeles